Real Talk 2000 is the third and final album by 3X Krazy. It was released on January 18, 2000 for Dubble Barrell Records and featured production from Lev Berlak, Bosko and Wolverine.  By the time of this album's release, the group had disbanded, but in 2003 the group reunited.

Track listing
"Ghetto Got Me Krazy" - 5:11
"Big League" - 3:30
"Hatin' on a Playa" - 4:56
"Big Body Benz" - 4:33
"Rocketship" - 4:05
"Real Thuggs" - 4:39
"Twalnut" - 4:09
"Where My Niggas At" - 4:38
"Lifestyles" - 4:02
"Keep It P.I." - 5:05
"Dirty Work" - 4:27
"Fuck All These Hoe's" - 4:53 (Featuring Yukmouth)
"Thugg Shit" - 3:26
"Hard Times" - 4:56

2000 albums
3X Krazy albums
Albums produced by Bosko